Saint-Parres-aux-Tertres is a commune in the Aube department in north-central France.

Geography
The Barse flows into the Vieille Seine, an arm of the Seine, in the commune.

Population

See also
 Communes of the Aube department

References

Communes of Aube
Aube communes articles needing translation from French Wikipedia